Theobalds Grove is a London Overground station on the Southbury Loop section of the Lea Valley lines, located in Waltham Cross, Hertfordshire. The station is named after the nearby Theobalds Palace grounds.

The station is in Travelcard Zone 7.

History
The railway line from Bury Street Junction, north of the current Edmonton Green station, to Cheshunt was opened by the Great Eastern Railway on 1 October 1891. It was known as the Churchbury Loop.

The district served by the line was still predominantly rural, and the coming of the tram to Waltham Cross in 1904 saw the railway unable to compete. Passenger services ceased on 1 October 1909, but were reinstated for the benefit of munitions workers between 1 March 1915 and 1 July 1919.

After that the line was only served by freight trains until the line was electrified as part of a wider scheme, and Theobalds Grove station reopened to passengers on 21 November 1960. The line is now known as the Southbury Loop.

The goods depot at the station closed in 1967. Its site is now the station car park .

The station was much changed in the early 1980s along with several other stations on the line. The roofs on both platforms were removed and modern shorter replacements were installed (similar structures were built at Seven Sisters Station at the same time). Steel stairs replaced the wooden stairs leading up to the north-bound platforms though the wooden cover was retained. The London-bound staircase was left unaltered. The ticket office was also partially reconstructed.

From 2 January 2013, Oyster cards have been accepted at the station. The station is in Travelcard zone 7.

On 31 May 2015 the station and all services that call here transferred from Abellio Greater Anglia to London Overground Rail Operations.

Services
The typical off-peak service of trains per hour (tph) is as follows:

References

External links

Railway stations in Hertfordshire
Former Great Eastern Railway stations
Railway stations in Great Britain opened in 1891
Railway stations in Great Britain closed in 1909
Railway stations in Great Britain opened in 1915
Railway stations in Great Britain closed in 1919
Railway stations in Great Britain opened in 1960
Reopened railway stations in Great Britain
Waltham Cross
Railway stations served by London Overground